The Fengshan River is a river in northern Taiwan. It flows through Hsinchu County for 45 km.

See also
List of rivers in Taiwan

References

Rivers of Taiwan
Landforms of Hsinchu County